John Wright Bowles was an  Anglican priest in Ireland.

Bowles was born in County Cork and  educated at Trinity College, Dublin. He was ordained deacon in 1846 and priest in 1848. Bowles was the incumbent at  Nenagh. He was Archdeacon of Killaloe from 1884 until his death on 24 August 1888.

References

Alumni of Trinity College Dublin
19th-century Irish Anglican priests
Archdeacons of Killaloe
People from County Cork
1888 deaths